= Office-holder =

An office-holder may refer to:

- An incumbent politician
- An employee
- Other official
